Real Book is an album by the bassist Steve Swallow, released on the Xtra Watt label in 1994.

Reception

AllMusic awarded the album 4 stars and the review by Rick Anderson states: "This program finds him showing off his considerable writing chops with the help of an all-star group... His focus on the upper registers and the polyester tone of his five-string bass guitar will continue to annoy those who prefer to hear the bass played dark, low and woody, but there's no denying the consistent inventiveness of his playing or the charm of these compositions".

Track listing
All compositions by Steve Swallow.
 "Bite Your Grandmother" - 4:40
 "Second Handy Motion" - 4:47
 "Wrong Together" - 5:19
 "Outfits" - 5:52
 "Thinking Out Loud" - 5:04
 "Let's Eat" - 5:38
 "Better Times" - 3:49
 "Willow" - 4:13
 "Muddy in the Bank" - 3:20
 "Ponytail" - 6:26

Personnel
Steve Swallow - 5 string bass guitar
Tom Harrell - trumpet, flugelhorn
Joe Lovano - tenor saxophone
Mulgrew Miller - piano
Jack DeJohnette - drums

References

Steve Swallow albums
1994 albums